Neenchelys daedalus is an eel in the family Ophichthidae (worm/snake eels). It was described by John E. McCosker in 1982. It is a marine, tropical eel which is known from the western Pacific Ocean, including Papua New Guinea and Japan.

References

Fish described in 1982
daedalus